Borsk  is a village in the administrative district of Gmina Karsin, within Kościerzyna County, Pomeranian Voivodeship, in northern Poland. It is located within the ethnocultural region of Kashubia in the historic region of Pomerania.

The village has a population of 160.

Borsk was a royal village of the Polish Crown, administratively located in the Tuchola County in the Pomeranian Voivodeship.

References

Borsk